Suran (also Romanized as Sūrān; also known as Shūrān and Sūzān) is a village in Zhan Rural District, in the Central District of Dorud County, Lorestan Province, Iran. At the 2006 census, its population was 515, in 107 families.

References 

Towns and villages in Dorud County